The Demers Island is a river island of the Richelieu River. It is located in the territory of the municipality of Carignan, in the La Vallée-du-Richelieu Regional County Municipality, in the administrative region of Montérégie, in the south of province of Quebec, in Canada.

This island has a few private wharves on the west shore of the Chambly basin. Since the second half of XXth, its vocation has been residential and focused on recreotourism activities. This island includes the Rémy-Nolet leisure park.

Geography 

Demers Island occupies the western part of the Bassin-de-Chambly. This island is the third in area among the four islands separating the Bassin-de-Chambly and the Acadia River. The other islands are Île aux Lièvres, Goyer Island and Île au Foin (Hay Island). Demers Island is linked on the northeast side by a strip of land with Hay Island. A pedestrian bridge connects Île aux Lièvres and Île Goyer.

The canal continues on the northeast side, separating Demers Island and Hay Island. These narrow canals are bordered by a narrow strip of marshland.

Demers Island is accessible through a small bridge built on Demers Street (which becomes Daigneault Street in Chambly), to span the stream. This bridge thus links the island to rue Martel which runs along the Chambly basin in the city of Chambly.

Spring floods 
Spring floods often affected the land adjacent to the shores of Demers Island. The overflow of the Richelieu River is recurrent.

Toponymy 
At the beginning of the 20th century, Demers Island was designated by the inhabitants of the "Ile au Beurre" sector. This unofficial name comes from a wild plant called "petit beurre". Formerly, this plant was very widespread on this island. The toponym "Demers Island" evokes the memory of the Demers family. Joseph-Honoré Demers was the owner of this island in the first half of the 19th century.

Demers Island has 12 streets which are designated by tree names (e.g. Cedars, Oaks, Elms, Maple, Pines, Fir, Aspens, Lime trees). These streets are linked to rue Demers which runs along the Chambly basin.

The toponym "Île Demers" was formalized on August 17, 1978 at the Place Names Bank of the Commission de toponymie du Québec.

Notes and references

See also 
 List of islands of Canada#Quebec

River islands
River islands of Quebec
La Vallée-du-Richelieu Regional County Municipality